Sam McAlees (November 3, 1910 – September 29, 1993) was an American soccer player who earned two caps with the U.S. national team in 1937.  He also played six seasons in the American Soccer League.

Professional career
McAlees signed with the Philadelphia German-Americans of the American Soccer League in 1934.  He remained with Philadelphia through at least 1936 when the German-Americans defeated the St. Louis Shamrocks to win the 1936 National Challenge Cup  McAlees then moved to the New York Americans.  He retired from the ASL in 1940.

National team
His first game with the national team in a 7–2 loss to Mexico on September 12, 1937.  His second game was a 7–3 loss to Mexico on September 25, 1937.

McAlees was inducted into the Pennsylvania Sports Hall of Fame in 1985 and the Southeastern Pennsylvania Soccer Hall of Fame in 1988.

References

American soccer players
American Soccer League (1933–1983) players
New York Americans (soccer) (1933–1956) players
Uhrik Truckers players
United States men's international soccer players
1910 births
1993 deaths
Place of birth missing
Association footballers not categorized by position